David Johnson (June 12, 1961 – April 23, 2016) was a dancer who has performed in many TV broadcasts in Scandinavia, sometimes with Mary Johnson.

Selected notable performances 
 Kikki Danielsson - "Bra vibrationer" (Melodifestivalen 1985 and Eurovision Song Contest 1985)
 Dan Tillberg - "Ta min hand" (Melodifestivalen 1985)
 Lise Haavik - "Du er fuld af løgn"  (Eurovision Song Contest 1986)

1961 births
2016 deaths
Male dancers